On Foot, On Horse and On Wheels is the US title for the 1957 French comedy film, À pied, à cheval et en voiture.

It marked the film debut of Jean Paul Belmondo.

The movie was a massive hit at the French box office with admissions of 3,483,954. It led to a follow up A Dog, a Mouse, and a Sputnik.

Plot

Cast 
 Noël-Noël : Léon Martin 
 Denise Grey : Marguerite Martin 
 Sophie Daumier : Mireille Martin 
 Darry Cowl : Hubert 
 Jean Tissier : Le vendeur au Salon de l'Automobile
 Gil Vidal : Paul de Grandlieu 
 Aimé Clariond : Monsieur de Grandlieu 
 Viviane Gosset : Alice Lambert 
 Noël Roquevert : Mr Guillard 
 Suzanne Guémard : Hélène Guillard 
 Hubert Deschamps : Robichet 
 Jacques Fabbri : Auguste 
 Gérard Darrieu : Robert 
 Robert Vattier : L'inspecteur auto-école
 Pierre Mirat : Viviani 
 Edmond Ardisson : Duchemin 
 Joël Monteilhet : Le fils Duchemin
 Jean Galland : Mr Cordier 
 Pierre Leproux : Mr Chartis 
 Maurice Chevit : Léon 
 Henri Coutet : Un garde chasse de Mr de Grandlieu
 Jean-Pierre Jaubert : Chotard 
 Jean-Pierre Cassel : Mariel 
 Jean-Paul Belmondo : Venin 
 Jean-Pierre Moutier : Un copain de Mireille
 Bernard Musson : Un agent lors de l'accident

References

External links

film page at Le Film Guide

French comedy films
1957 films
1950s French films